Herman Lyle Smith (July 7, 1892 – 1950) was an American mathematician, the co-discoverer, with E. H. Moore, of nets, and also a discoverer of the related notion of filters independently of Henri Cartan.

Born in Pittwood, Illinois, Smith received his B.S. degree from the University of Oregon in 1914 and his M.S. from the University of Chicago the following year.  His Ph.D. was granted in 1926 by the University of Chicago for work done under Moore.  He was later employed as a professor of mathematics by Louisiana State University.

Notes

References

External links
 

1892 births
20th-century American mathematicians
Louisiana State University faculty
Topologists
1950 deaths
Mathematicians from Illinois
Date of death missing
University of Oregon alumni
University of Chicago alumni